The congressional office buildings are the office buildings used by the United States Congress to augment the limited space in the United States Capitol. The congressional office buildings are part of the Capitol Complex, and are thus under the authority of the Architect of the Capitol and protected by the United States Capitol Police. The office buildings house the individual offices of each U.S. Representative and Senator as well as committee hearing rooms, staff rooms, multiple cafeterias, and areas for support, committee, and maintenance staff.

The congressional office buildings are connected to the Capitol by means of underground pedestrian tunnels, some of which are equipped with small railcars shuttling users to and from the Capitol, which together form the Capitol subway system. Congressional pages are responsible for carrying packages and messages from the two chambers to the buildings. 

The three Senate office buildings are along Constitution Avenue north of the Capitol:
Russell Senate Office Building (RSOB, completed 1908)
Dirksen Senate Office Building (DSOB, completed 1958)
Hart Senate Office Building (HSOB, completed 1982)

The three House office buildings are along Independence Avenue south of the Capitol:
Cannon House Office Building (CHOB, completed 1908)
Longworth House Office Building (LHOB, completed 1933) 
Rayburn House Office Building (RHOB, completed 1965) 

A fourth building, the Ford House Office Building, which used to house the FBI's fingerprint records, sits a few blocks southwest of the others; it houses committee staff and administrative offices. 

A fifth building, the O'Neill House Office Building (previously known as "House Annex-1") was named after former Speaker of the House Thomas "Tip" O'Neill.  The building was demolished in 2002.  However, in 2008, Federal Office Building No. 8 (formerly the headquarters of the Food and Drug Administration) was renovated, being renamed the O'Neill House Office Building in 2012.  The building was transferred from General Services Administration to the Architect of the Capitol in 2017.  It currently houses both House administrative staff as well as offices for the Department of Health and Human Services. 

The U.S. Capitol Complex also includes a Page Residence Hall and a Capitol Power Plant, both on the House side of the Capitol.

See also
House Office Building Commission

 
United States Capitol
Capitol Hill